Basie Rides Again! is an album by pianist/bandleader Count Basie recorded in 1952 and originally released on the Clef label in 1956. Selections from this album were previously released on the 1954 Clef LP Basie Jazz.

Reception

AllMusic awarded the album 4½ stars.

Track listing
 "Jive at Five" (Count Basie, Harry Edison) - 3:06
 "Be My Guest" (Ernie Wilkins) - 3:00
 "No Name" (King Oliver) - 3:06
 "Blues for the Count and Oscar" (Basie, Oscar Peterson) - 3:04  
 "Redhead" (Oliver) - 2:47
 "Every Tub" (Basie, Eddie Durham) - 2:47
 "Goin' to Chicago" (Count Basie) - 3:17 	
 "Sent for You Yesterday and Here You Come Today" (Count Basie, Eddie Durham, Jimmy Rushing) - 3:09 	
 "Bread" (Wilkins) - 2:49 	
 "There's a Small Hotel" (Richard Rodgers, Lorenz Hart) - 3:29	
 "Tippin' on the Q. T." (Buck Clayton) - 3:00 	
 "Blee-Blop Blues" (A. K. Salim) - 3:16
Recorded at Fine Sound Studios in New York City on January 25, (tracks 1, 3, 5 & 6), July 22 (tracks 9-12), July 26 (track 2 & 4) and December 12 (tracks 7 & 8), 1952

Personnel 
Count Basie - piano, organ
Paul Campbell (tracks 1-3 & 5-12), Wendell Culley (tracks 1-3 & 5-12), Reunald Jones (tracks 2 & 7-12), Joe Newman (tracks 1-3 & 5-8), Charlie Shavers (tracks 1, 3, 5 & 6) - trumpet
Henry Coker (tracks 1-3 & 5-12), Benny Powell (tracks 2, 3 & 5-12), Jimmy Wilkins (tracks 2, 3 & 5-12) - trombone 
Marshall Royal - alto saxophone, clarinet (tracks 2, 3 &  5-12)
Ernie Wilkins -  alto saxophone, tenor saxophone, arranger (tracks 2, 3 & 5-12)
Eddie "Lockjaw" Davis (tracks 2, 4 & 9-12), Floyd Johnson (tracks 3, 5 & 6), Paul Quinichette (tracks 2 & 4) - tenor saxophone
Charlie Fowlkes - baritone saxophone (tracks 2, 3 & 5-12)
Oscar Peterson - piano (tracks 2 & 4)
Freddie Green - guitar 
Ray Brown (tracks 2 & 4), Jimmy Lewis (tracks 1, 3, 5, 6 & 9-12), Gene Ramey (tracks 7 & 8) - bass
Gus Johnson (tracks 1-6 & 9-12), Buddy Rich (tracks 7 & 8) - drums
Al Hibbler - vocals (tracks 7 & 8)
Buck Clayton (track 11), Neal Hefti (tracks 1 & 6), Sy Oliver (tracks 3 & 5), A. K. Salim (track 12) - arranger

References 

1956 albums
Count Basie Orchestra albums
Clef Records albums
Verve Records albums
Albums arranged by Ernie Wilkins
Albums arranged by Neal Hefti
Albums arranged by Sy Oliver
Albums produced by Norman Granz